A. robustum  may refer to:
 Achnatherum robustum, the sleepy grass, a perennial plant species found on dry soil in the American Midwest
 Astronidium robustum, a plant species endemic to Fiji